Rushikesh Ganeshbhai Patel is an Indian politician from Gujarat. He is an incumbent cabinet minister of Government of Gujarat.

Early life 
Rushikesh Patel has studied Diploma in Civil Engineering.

Political career 
Rushikesh Patel is a member of Bharatiya Janata Party (BJP). He has served as the BJP President of Mehsana district. He has served as a chairman of APMC, Visnagar. He has served as the Member of Gujarat Legislative Assembly for its 12th (2007-2012), 13th (2012-2017) and 14th (2017-2022) legislative assemblies and continues to serve in 15th(since 2022) legislative assembly from Visnagar constituency. He became Cabinet Minister in Bhupendra Patel ministry holding health and family welfare; medical education; and water resources and supply ministries in September 2021. He was re-elected from Visnagar in 2022 Gujarat Legislative Assembly election for 15th Gujarat Legislative Assembly and has become Cabinet Minister in Bhupendra Patel ministry holding Health and Family Welfare, Higher and Technical Education, Medical Education, Law and Justice and Parliamentary Affairs in the current Cabinet.

References 

Living people
Bharatiya Janata Party politicians from Gujarat
Gujarat MLAs 2017–2022
Gujarat MLAs 2007–2012
Gujarat MLAs 2012–2017
People from Mehsana district
1961 births
Gujarat MLAs 2022–2027